DreamHack is an ESL Gaming brand specializing in esports tournaments and other gaming conventions. It is recognized by the Guinness Book of Records and Twin Galaxies as being the world's largest LAN party and computer festival with the world's fastest Internet connection and the most generated traffic. (The Internet connection record was beaten in 2012 by the world's second-largest computer festival, The Gathering in Norway.) It usually holds its events in Western Europe and North America.

Events summary
DreamHack's events include local area network gatherings with live concerts and competitions in digital art and esports. The first event was held in Malung, Sweden. The company has held several gaming events throughout Europe, in Stockholm, Jönköping, Tours, Bucharest, Cluj, Valencia, Seville, London, and Leipzig. In May 2016, it held its first North American event in Austin, Texas. In August 2016, it held its first Canada event in Montreal, Quebec. Winter events consistently have about 10% more visitors than summer events.

Attendees range from elementary school students to senior citizens. The average age is 16–17.

The event has five major components:

DreamHack events are arranged with the help of about 800 volunteers, set up in "Crew Teams", who work in shifts to provide around-the-clock services for visitors. A support crew has a helpdesk where participants can address technical problems. The festival also relies on local police and security officers who patrol the area.

History

Dreamhack began as a small gathering of schoolmates and friends in the basement of an elementary school in Malung, Sweden, in the early 1990s. In 1994, it was moved to the school cafeteria and became one of the larger regional demo tech and gaming events at the time. This event was also the first to be called DreamHack.

In 1997, the event took place at Arena Kupolen in Borlänge and became the largest LAN party of Sweden and the third largest party in Scandinavia at the time. Furthermore, DreamHack 2001 and the upcoming events were held at the Elmia exhibition centre in Jönköping, where it has been since.

In 2002, DreamHack had events twice a year. Initially, DreamHack Summer in June was focused on computer games, and DreamHack Winter was more focused on computer program demos and was held during the last weekend of November. Today, the focus of summer and winter is same.

In 2011, DreamHack AB went through a corporate reform, renewing the company administration.

DreamHack winter 2011 hosted League of Legends season 1 World Championship. The next year's League of Legends World Championship was held independently.

It was announced on November 15, 2012, that DreamHack would be partnering with Major League Gaming (MLG) and Electronic Sports League (ESL) to help facilitate the growth and development of the North American and European esports scene. These partnerships included universal rankings, unified competition structures, and more.

In 2013, DreamHack AB grew into a corporation. Later they added a third event during the late summer in Stockholm. It was hosted at Globe Arenas in 2014.

In November 2015, Modern Times Group bought DreamHack for 244 million Swedish krona.

In 2020, on the 30th of September, ESL announced that it had merged with DreamHack. The two companies are functioning as one, but the two brands are operated separately.

References

External links
 Official website

 
Modern Times Group
1990s establishments in Sweden